The Covenant Health Knoxville Marathon is an annual marathon foot-race run in Knoxville, Tennessee, USA, established in 2005.   A prize fund of $10,000 is distributed between the top finishers in the marathon and half marathon.

History 

The  race was established in 2005 and has been run annually ever since.

The 2020 in-person edition of the race was cancelled due to the coronavirus pandemic, with all registrants given the option of running the race virtually, transferring their entry to 2021 or 2022, or obtaining a refund.

Course 

The course starts in Downtown Knoxville at Clinch Ave. bridge near the Knoxville Convention Center in the shadows of the Sunsphere. The race boasted a unique finish, ending on the 50 yard line of the University of Tennessee's Neyland Stadium, from 2005 to 2018. In 2019, the finish line was changed to World's Fair Park due to stadium renovations and this remains the finish line today.

The course time limit is 7 hours.

Winners

Notes

References

External links
Knoxville Marathon
Findamarathon.com - Knoxville Marathon
HalfMarathons.Net - Knoxville Marathon, Half Marathon, Relay & 5K 

Recurring sporting events established in 2005
Marathons in the United States
Sports in Knoxville, Tennessee
Tourist attractions in Knoxville, Tennessee